Patrick Brian Warfield (born 2 April 1946, Holles Street, Dublin) is the vocalist, banjo, harp and bodhrán player and lead songwriter with long-standing Irish band The Wolfe Tones. Brian introduces many of the songs at the Wolfe Tones live concerts and is a keen historian.

Career 
Warfield has written many songs for the Wolfe Tones, notably "The Helicopter Song", "Irish Eyes" and "My Heart is in Ireland". "Let the People Sing", was written in dedication to those Irish ballad singers who were banned from singing Irish songs. It has been performed by many Celtic and Irish Rebel bands, including Celtic band Charlie and the Bhoys. The song is popular among fans of Celtic F.C. and a version "Let The People Sing" performed by The Malleys, omitting the second verse, is played at Celtic Park on match days.

Warfield's affiliation with Celtic Football Club led to him being asked to write a song for the Club to celebrate its 100th Anniversary. As a result, Celtic Symphony was composed; a song popular with many Celtic fans, but controversial due to its chorus.  The chorus which features the words "ooh, ah, up the RA" was often seen as a pro-IRA stance, but according to its writer, Brian Warfield, these words were included in the balladic tradition of writing what is observed at the time.

As a songwriter, Warfield's writing is typically a social commentary on Ireland and its issues. For the 2012 album, Child of Destiny, Warfield composed 'Swing A Banker', which is a comical ballad referring to Irish bankers as chickens. The music video was recorded outside the Treasury Building in Dublin. He is currently working on a musical about the famine.

He continues to tour with The Wolfe Tones with Tommy Byrne and Noel Nagle, although it was announced they will cease touring after their 50th Anniversary Tour in November 2014.

Personal life 
Brian Warfield is married to June Warfield (née Radburn) and has four children. He resides near Blessington, County Wicklow. He has not spoken with his brother Derek Warfield since Derek left the Wolfe Tones in 2001.

References

Irish banjoists
Irish folk musicians
Irish songwriters
Living people
1946 births
The Wolfe Tones members